Elvis Perkins in Dearland is the second studio album by Elvis Perkins, and his first with backing band Elvis Perkins in Dearland, released on March 10, 2009, on XL Recordings.

Upon release, Perkins stated that he did not wish to record another album like its predecessor:I'd no interest in making Ash Wednesday II. After the dust had settled I was weary, worn and confused about what had happened, especially that people thought it was so personal. I had a talk with myself as to how I might deal with things second time around. Part of this involved making a band record removed from self and giving three other dudes a say. It's a broader vision.

Track listing 
All songs written by Elvis Perkins
 "Shampoo"
 "Hey"
 "Hours Last Stand"
 "I Heard Your Voice in Dresden"
 "Send My Fond Regards to Lonelyville"
 "I'll Be Arriving"
 "Chains, Chains, Chains"
 "Doomsday"
 "123 Goodbye"
 "How's Forever Been Baby"

Chart performance

References

2009 albums
Elvis Perkins albums
XL Recordings albums